A.S.D. Tre Pini Matese was an Italian association football club based in Sepicciano, Piedimonte Matese, Caserta, Campania. Although based in Campania, the club were members of Promozione (Molise) and Eccellenza (Molise).

History
The club was founded in 2012 as A.S.D. Tre Pini Sporting Matese. Tre Pini Sporting Matese was admitted to Prima Categoria for the 2012–13 season, winning promotion to Promozione Molise after finishing as champions and recording a total of 76 points from 30 games.

During the 2015–16 season, Tre Pini finished as runners-up to Polisportiva Gioventù Calcio Dauna in Eccellenza Molise. There was some controversy over Dauna and U.S. Venafro's involvement in a corruption scandal. As a result of this, several representatives of Gioventù Dauna received fines ranging from €5,000 to €10,000, while the other accused club, Venafro, was fined a sum of €4,000. Dauna's first-place finish was awarded, to second-placed Tre Pini, with the accused club; set to remain in Eccellenza for the subsequent campaign. Consequently, Tre Pini; was temporarily admitted to Serie D for the 2016–17 season. However, following this decision, a federal tribunal found Dauna innocent of any wrongdoing and its title and subsequent promotion; was restored, placing Tre Pini Matese back in Eccellenza.

Cup run
The 2013–14 season saw the club compete in the Coppa Italia Dilettanti Molise for the first time in its history. Tre Pini failed to make it past the group stage. The following season, the team qualified for the semi-finals of the cup. And this was mirrored in the 2015–16 season. The 2016–17 season saw them top their group; and reach the quarter-finals of the tournament. However, Tre Pini would fall to a (6–5 aggregate defeat) after winning the home leg 3–2, then losing 2–4 away to Isernia.

Colors and club crest
Tre Pini's home colours were green and white. The club's badge depicted three pine trees atop three peaks paid homage to the town Piedimonte Matese and the surrounding area in the mountainous region of Campania in Southern Italy.

Nearby clubs
Their closest rivals in terms of distance were A.S.D. Alliphae, an Alife-based club, and then the more established Caserta-based outfit Casertana. The distance between Alife and Piedimonte Matese is about 3.3 miles (5.5 km), whilst Caserta is approximately 24 miles (40 km) away.

Matches
Tre Pini Matese twice met local rivals Casertana in the same calendar year, with the first encounter coming on 11 February 2016, when they hosted a friendly against Casertana, which saw I Falchetti run out 10−0 winners. Following their crushing defeat back in February, a rematch was contested at Tre Pini's - Stadio Pasqualino Ferrante; on 21 August during the 2016−17 pre-season. Goals from Matmute and Giorno were enough to give the away side a second successive victory over their rivals.

Sponsorship and kit manufacturers
Tre Pini Matese's home and away kits were produced by Italian international sports brand Zeus Sports and, their shirts sponsor was 'Città di Piedimonte Matese'.

Players

Current squad

Former players

  Marco Di Baia
  Federico Barile
  Nicolas Barone
  Simone Carpentino
  Guido Cinicola
  Francesco Cristillo
  Claudio Di Domenico
  Vincenzo Fappiano
  Luigi Rega
  Simone Marra
  Raffaele Di Nardo
  Domenico D'Ovidio
  Pietro Pacilio
  Vittorio Pellegrino
  Alessio Raucci
  Gianmarco Raviele
  Alessandro Ferrante
  Daniele Napoletano
  Stefano Di Sorbo
  Vincenzo Varricchione
  Giuseppe Zotti

Player records
Most goals
Daniele Napoletano – 119 : 2014–15, 2015–16, 2016–17

Most goals in one season
Daniele Napoletano – : 43 : 2015–16, 2016–17

Non-playing staff

Staff

Club honours

Domestic

League
Prima Categoria (Girone A)
Winners: 2012−13
Promozione Molise
Winners: 2013−14
Eccellenza Molise
Runners-up: 2015–16

Cup
 Coppa Italia Dilettanti Molise
Winners (2): 2018–19, 2019–20

Managers
  Mario Morra (2014–2016)
  Alessandro Cagnale (2016–2017)
  Marco Palazzo (2016–2017)
  Ernesto Geloso (2017)
  Silvano Romagnini (2017–2019) 
 Alfonso Camorani (2019–2020)

Club records
Longest winning run
10 matches

Longest home winning streak
14 matches

Biggest wins
Home
8–1 against Cliternina, 18 December 2016 (Eccellenza Molise)
8–1 against Turris Santangiolese, 10 March 2013 (Prima Categoria)
7–0 against Forulum, 16 December 2012 (Prima Categoria)
6–0 against Cerro Al Volturno, 24 March 2013 (Prima Categoria)
6–1 against Aurora Pizzone, 14 October 2012 (Prima Categoria)
5–2 against Spinete, 3 December 2016 (Eccellenza Molise)
5–1 against Atletico Sant. Agapito, 13 January 2013 (Prima Categoria)
4–0 against Pesche, 20 January 2013 (Prima Categoria)
4–0 against Civitanova, 14 April 2013 (Prima Categoria)
4–1 against San Pietro Avellana, 21 October 2012 (Prima Categoria)
4–2 against Atletico Sanniti, 4 November 2012 (Prima Categoria)
Away
1–5 against Bagnolese, 9 December 2012 (Prima Categoria)
0–5 against Alliphae, 14 January 2017 (Eccellenza Molise)

Biggest losses
Home
0−10 against Casertana, 11 February 2016 (pre-season friendly)
Away
4–0 against Montenero, 21 April 2013 (Prima Categoria)
4–2 against Forulum, 5 May 2013 (Prima Categoria)

References

External links
 Official Website
 Official Twitter Page
 Tre Pini Matese at Social Calcio360.com

 
Football clubs in Campania
Association football clubs established in 2012
2012 establishments in Italy
Piedimonte Matese
Defunct football clubs in Italy
Association football clubs disestablished in 2020

2020 disestablishments in Italy